Gustav Maier (born 15 December 1906, date of death unknown) was a German rower. He competed in the men's eight event at the 1928 Summer Olympics.

References

1906 births
Year of death missing
German male rowers
Olympic rowers of Germany
Rowers at the 1928 Summer Olympics
Sportspeople from Mannheim